G. Padmanabhan Thampi (1929-26 November 2002) was an Indian politician and leader of Communist Party of India. He represented Thiruvalla constituency in 1st Kerala Legislative Assembly.

References

Communist Party of India politicians from Kerala
1929 births
2002 deaths
Kerala MLAs 1957–1959